Jacobus Stephanus "Bees" Roux (born 9 December 1981 in Upington) is a South African rugby union player, currently playing with . His regular position is prop.

Career

In 2007, he joined Kimberley-based side , where he played his rugby over the next three seasons. He also spent the off-season at the end of 2008 playing some rugby for French Top 14 side Clermont, appearing in both the Top 14 and Heineken Cup competitions.

In August 2010, Roux assaulted police officer Sergeant Ntshimane Johannes Mogale, killing him. He was charged with murder, but in a plea bargain agreement, was convicted of culpable homicide and given a five-year prison sentence in September 2011, suspended on the condition that he paid R750 000 to the widow of the police officer.

He continued his career in France, joining Bordeaux Bègles for the 2011–12 Top 14 season and then playing for Italian side Benetton Treviso in the 2012–13 Pro 12 competition.

Representative rugby
He also played for a Highveld XV team against the British & Irish Lions during their tour to South Africa, starting the match and scoring a try.

References

South African rugby union players
Living people
1981 births
People from Upington
Blue Bulls players
Bulls (rugby union) players
Cheetahs (rugby union) players
Golden Lions players
Griquas (rugby union) players
Leopards (rugby union) players
ASM Clermont Auvergne players
Benetton Rugby players
Rugby union props
Rugby union players from the Northern Cape